Githopsis is a small genus of flowering plants in the bellflower family which are known as bluecups. These are small annual wildflowers with white or purple white-throated blooms. Bluecups are native to western North America, especially California. There are four known species within the genus.

Species:

 Githopsis diffusa A.Gray - San Gabriel bluecup  - California, Baja California, Guadalupe Island
 Githopsis pulchella Vatke - Sierra bluecup - Sacramento Valley of California
 Githopsis specularioides Nutt. - common bluecup - Vancouver Island, Washington, Oregon, California, northern Idaho, northwestern Montana
 Githopsis tenella Morin - tubeflower bluecup - California

References

Campanuloideae
Campanulaceae genera